Gianfranco Sardagna (born 28 May 1935) is a retired Italian basketball player. He was part of Italian teams that finished fourth and fifth at the 1960 and 1964 Summer Olympics, respectively.

References

1935 births
Living people
Olympic basketball players of Italy
Basketball players at the 1960 Summer Olympics
Basketball players at the 1964 Summer Olympics
Italian men's basketball players